Steven Michael Liddle (born March 4, 1959 in Nashville, Tennessee) is an American former professional baseball player, coach and manager.

Coaching career
He was previously the Minnesota Twins' bench coach from 2002–2010 before swapping roles with Scott Ullger and becoming the Twins third base coach for 2011 and 2012. In October 2012, after two 96 plus losing seasons, it was announced Liddle's contract would not be renewed thus ending his stint in Minnesota.

On November 2, 2017, Liddle was named the bench coach for the Detroit Tigers for the 2018 season, a role he previously had with Ron Gardenhire and the Twins. After the 2019 season with the team, he retired and was succeeded by Lloyd McClendon.

References

External links

1959 births
Living people
American expatriate baseball players in Canada
Baseball coaches from Tennessee
Baseball players from Nashville, Tennessee
Detroit Tigers coaches
Edmonton Trappers players
Fort Myers Miracle players
Holyoke Millers players
Idaho Falls Angels players
Lipscomb Bisons baseball players
Major League Baseball bench coaches
Midland Angels players
Minnesota Twins coaches
Minor league baseball managers
Nashua Angels players
Orlando Twins players
Portland Beavers players
Redwood Pioneers players
Visalia Oaks players